Pure Football (also known as Pure Futbol in North America) is a football video game developed by Ubisoft Vancouver and published by Ubisoft. It was announced in March 2010 with a trailer and was released June 1, 2010, for PS3 and Xbox 360. This is an arcade-style football game in which players can select teams from around the world. The game includes seventeen national teams and three special teams (US all-time team, Germany, and World One). Players compete in exhibition and campaign gameplay modes.

Reception

Pure Football received negative reviews from critics. On Metacritic, the game holds scores of 46/100 for the PlayStation 3 version based on 12 reviews and 38/100 for the Xbox 360 version based on 20 reviews.

References

External links
 

2010 video games
Association football video games
Xbox 360 games
PlayStation 3 games
Ubisoft games
Video games developed in Canada